Peter Russell may refer to:
 Patricia "Peter" Russell (1910–2004), third wife of Bertrand Russell
 Peter Edward Lionel Russell (1913–2006) British historian
 Peter H. Russell (born 1932), Canadian political scientist and writer
 Peter Nicol Russell (1816–1905), Australian philanthropist and university benefactor
 Peter Russell (cricketer) (born 1939), English cricketer
 Peter Russell (politician) (1733–1808), Canadian gambler, government official, politician and judge
 Peter Russell (poet) (1921–2003), British poet, translator and critic
 Peter Russell (footballer) (born 1935), English footballer active in the 1950s
 Peter Russell (fashion designer) (1886–1966), IncSoc founder member and designer active in Britain from 1931–53
 Peter Russell (ice hockey) (born 1974), British ice hockey player and coach

See also
 Russell Peters (born 1970), Canadian comedian
 Russ Peterson (disambiguation)